Gemma Magría (born 14 April 1981) is a Spanish taekwondo practitioner. 

She won a bronze medal in at the 2000 European Taekwondo Championships. She won a silver medal in bantamweight at the 2001 World Taekwondo Championships in Jeju City, after being defeated by Jung Jae-eun in the final.

References

External links

1981 births
Living people
Spanish female taekwondo practitioners
World Taekwondo Championships medalists
21st-century Spanish women